Panagiotis Symelidis (born 3 November 1992) is a Greek professional footballer who plays as a winger for Super League club Levadiakos.

Honours
Levadiakos
Super League 2: 2021–22

References

1992 births
Living people
Greek footballers
Gamma Ethniki players
Football League (Greece) players
Super League Greece 2 players
Super League Greece players
Tilikratis F.C. players
A.E. Ermionida F.C. players
Apollon Smyrnis F.C. players
Agrotikos Asteras F.C. players
Apollon Pontou FC players
Trikala F.C. players
Athlitiki Enosi Larissa F.C. players
Levadiakos F.C. players
Association football wingers
Footballers from Kozani